Patrick Costello (born 21 May 1980) is an Irish Green Party politician who has been a Teachta Dála (TD) for the Dublin South-Central constituency since the 2020 general election.

Early life
Costello attended Gonzaga College before studying at University College Dublin, graduating with a Bachelor of Arts in Psychology in 2002. He did a course in Drugs Counselling Theory and Intervention Skills. He later completed a Master of Social Work at Trinity College Dublin.

After graduating, Costello worked in a variety of front line roles in homeless agencies and services for adults and children. He worked in Merchants Quay Ireland, Focus Ireland and for the HSE. He was working as a child protection social worker when he first ran for the local elections.

Costello is a board member of Clay Youth Project in Crumlin and served as a Human Rights Observer in Palestine with EAPPI.

Political career
He ran in the 2014 Dublin City Council election in the Rathgar–Rathmines local electoral area and topped the poll. He then ran again in the 2019 Dublin City Council election in the Kimmage–Rathmines local electoral area and again topped the poll.

At the general election in February 2020, Costello was elected as a TD for the Dublin South-Central constituency. Carolyn Moore was co-opted to Costello's seat on Dublin City Council following his election to the Dáil.

In December 2020 Costello, alongside fellow Green TD Neasa Hourigan, raised major concerns about the entry of Ireland into the Comprehensive Economic and Trade Agreement (CETA), a trade agreement between Canada and members of the EU, due to fears about the proposed investment court system. The investment court system is designed to act as a method of solving business disputes between investors and participating countries. Costello argued that the court system would allow Canadians investing in Ireland to sue the state if the state impeded their profits, such as with environmentalist laws, and this was a major threat to Ireland's sovereignty. Costello suggested that the matter may need to be resolved by a referendum. In July 2021 Costello brought the matter before the High Court, arguing aspects of the trade deal would be unconstitutional. In Costello v. Government of Ireland, the High Court ruled in September 2021 against Costello. In November 2022, the Supreme Court found on appeal that current Irish law prohibited ratification of CETA.

On 17 May 2022 Costello and Hourigan were both suspended from the Green Party for six months after they voted against the government on a motion calling for the new National Maternity Hospital to be built on land wholly owned by the state. The government coalition parties (Fine Gael, Fianna Fáil and the Greens) had been whipped to abstain on the motion. Costello and Hourigan were re-admitted to the parliamentary part in November 2022.

Personal life
He is married to Hazel Chu, former chair of the Green Party and former Lord Mayor of Dublin. They first met while both studying at University College Dublin. They have one daughter.

His mother Mary Litton Costello was an administrator in Trinity College Dublin and his father Peter Costello is an author and expert on James Joyce.

References

External links
Green Party profile

Living people
1980 births
Alumni of Trinity College Dublin
Alumni of University College Dublin
Green Party (Ireland) TDs
Local councillors in Dublin (city)
Members of the 33rd Dáil